Gumboot Soup is the thirteenth studio album by Australian psychedelic rock band King Gizzard & the Lizard Wizard. It was released on 31 December 2017 by Flightless. The album is the final of five albums released by the band in 2017. The artwork was designed by longtime band collaborator Jason Galea.

Background

Stu Mackenzie stated in an interview that the album is composed of songs that didn't fit in any of the other four albums released by the band in 2017, and that the album is more song oriented than the other releases that year. He also stated that he worked through the Christmas period of 2017 to complete the album before the end of the year.

Track listing 
Vinyl releases have tracks 1–6 on Side A, and tracks 7–11 on Side B.

Personnel 
Credits for Gumboot Soup adapted from liner notes.

King Gizzard & the Lizard Wizard
 Michael Cavanagh – drums (tracks 1–9, 11)
 Cook Craig – guitar (tracks 2, 3, 6, 7, 9), vocals (tracks 3, 6), keys (tracks 3, 6), bass guitar (tracks 3, 6), mellotron (track 6)
 Ambrose Kenny-Smith – vocals (tracks 1, 3, 4, 6, 8–11), harmonica (tracks 9, 10), synthesizer (track 7), keys (track 9)
 Stu Mackenzie – vocals (tracks 1, 2, 4, 7–11), keys (tracks 1, 3, 4, 6, 8, 10, 11), percussion (tracks 1–4, 9–11), guitar (tracks 1, 2, 4, 7, 9, 10), mellotron (tracks 1, 3, 6, 8, 10), flute (tracks 1, 3–6), saxophone (tracks 4, 5, 6, 9), bass (tracks 1, 10), synthesizer (tracks 2, 7), drums (track 10)
 Eric Moore – drums (tracks 7, 9)
 Lucas Skinner – bass (tracks 2, 4, 7, 9), keys (tracks 8, 11), piano (track 1)
 Joey Walker – guitar (tracks 2, 4, 5, 7, 9), bass (tracks 5, 8, 11), synthesizer (track 5), vocals (track 5), percussion (track 5)
Production
 Stu Mackenzie – recording (tracks 1, 2, 4, 7–11), additional recording (tracks 2–6), mixing (tracks 3, 4, 6, 9, 10, 11)
 Cook Craig – recording (tracks 3, 6)
 Joey Walker – recording (track 5), mixing (tracks 2, 5)
 Michael Badger – mixing (tracks 1, 7, 8)
 Joe Carra – mastering

Design
 Jason Galea – artwork and layout
 Jamie Wdziekonski – photography

Charts

References

2017 albums
King Gizzard & the Lizard Wizard albums
Flightless (record label) albums
Stoner rock albums
Neo-psychedelia albums
Psychedelic rock albums by Australian artists